Ainsley Cameron Seiger (born 1998) is an American actress who currently appears as a series regular on Law & Order: Organized Crime as Jet Slootmaekers.

Early life
Seiger is from Cary, North Carolina. Seiger's mother is an opera singer and voice coach, and her father is a jeweler and goldsmith. 

Seiger attended Apex High School. While there, she played Wednesday in the school's production of The Addams Family, Cosette in Les Misérables, and Nikki in Curtains the Musical. In July 2016, she was selected as a Triangle Rising Stars by the Durham Performing Arts Center. In addition to being a qualifying event for the National High School Musical Theatre Awards, winners of the Triangle Rising Stars received a $1,000 scholarship and spent a week in New York City performing at Minskoff Theatre, working with Broadway professionals, and representing the Triangle at the Jimmy Awards.

Seiger then attended the University of North Carolina School of the Arts in Winston-Salem, graduating in 2020. While there, she played  Wendla in a production of Spring Awakening.

Career 
Seiger played the lead role in Violet at the PlayMakers Summer Youth Conservatory in July 2021. Her first screen role was in 2012 for the short film American Waste. She was also in the short film Bernstein’s MASS: An Artist’s Call for Peace.

In February 2021, Seiger became a regular on NBC's Law & Order: Organized Crime, playing the role of hacker Jet Slootmaekers. Because of COVID, she was cast for the role by submitting a recording. A week later, she was cast and had two days to move to New York for shooting. This was her first television credit.

Personal life
Seiger uses any pronouns (she/they/he), and is bisexual.

Filmography

Film

Television

References

External links
 

1998 births
Living people
People from Cary, North Carolina
University of North Carolina School of the Arts alumni
21st-century American actresses
Actresses from North Carolina
American television actresses
Bisexual actresses
American bisexual actors